The Acura MDX is a mid-size luxury crossover SUV with three-row seating produced by the Japanese automaker Honda under its luxury Acura division since 2000. The alphanumeric moniker stands for "Multi-Dimensional" luxury. It has ranked as the second-best selling mid-size luxury SUV after the Lexus RX.

The MDX is the first luxury crossover SUV to have standard third-row seating, and shares its platform with the Honda Pilot. The Pilot was made available with an eight person seating configuration, while the MDX exclusively seats seven, with two seating positions in the third row. The MDX was introduced on October 5, 2000 as a 2001 model, replacing the slow-selling U.S.-only body-on-frame SLX, based on the Isuzu Trooper. In Japan, it was made to replace the Honda Horizon (also based on the Trooper) which was discontinued in 1999. In 2003, the vehicle went on sale in Japan and Australia as the Honda MDX; sales with Honda badges ended with the introduction of the second generation three years later.

First generation (YD1; 2001) 

Derived from Honda's Global mid-size platform which underpins cars like the Honda Accord, Acura TL, TSX and Odyssey, it is powered by a J35A3 3.5 L SOHC 24 valve V6 engine with VTEC. The cargo floor can flip up to provide two additional seats. The vehicle is designed to hold 7 passengers, but the third row seats are small and only seat two, in contrast to the Odyssey and Pilot whose third row holds three passengers.

The vehicle features an automatic four wheel drive system (named VTM-4) that engages during off the line acceleration as well as when wheel slippage is detected. Additionally, the system offers a lock mode which can be activated and operated at low speeds and provides permanent 4WD and the equivalent of a locked rear differential; designed for climbing steep hills and getting out of stuck situations. To reduce drivetrain noise and increase fuel efficiency, the system runs as front wheel drive during normal cruising. The VTM-4 AWD system in the MDX has the same design as the VTM-4 systems found in the Honda Pilot and Honda Ridgeline. It is different than Honda's "RealTime AWD" system in the Honda CR-V and other models in that it can lock and it attempts to predict when traction will be lost and apply power to all four wheels before slippage occurs (by monitoring throttle inputs).

The navigation system and DVD entertainment system (also popular on other Honda/Acura models, such as the CR-V and Odyssey) options were mutually exclusive in the 2002 model. Both could be ordered at the same time since the 2003 model. The navigation option comes with a backup camera since the 2003 model. Since 2005, the navigation system featured information from Zagat about restaurants and other points of interest. The 2003 model was rated as Ultra Low Emission Vehicle. The United States Environmental Protection Agency estimates  highway and  city.

For the 2003 model, the engine was improved to produce 20 hp (15 kW) more power than the earlier models, and the wheel designs were updated. The 2004 model is credited with a top speed of 137 mph, and a 0-60 time of 7.1 seconds. The 2004 model features dual tail pipes instead of the single pipe in earlier models, side curtain airbags, new head lights and tail lights, and new wheels. Some chrome trimmings on the 2004 model use matte finish to distinguish from the polished shiny finish on earlier models. Little changed for the MDX during the 2006 model year with a few minor revisions to the vehicle's chrome and faux wood interior trim which could now be had with a dark grey wood (as opposed to reddish wood on earlier models), and also a black dash and steering wheel in tan interiors.

Second generation (YD2; 2007) 

On April 11, 2006, Acura unveiled the 2007 Acura MD-X Concept during the New York International Auto Show, showing to the public an indication about the exterior styling of the upcoming completely redesigned MDX. The second-generation MDX was released on October 17, 2006 in the U.S.

The second generation model's body has a wider track and longer wheelbase than the previous MDX, but visibility to the rear has worsened from the prior generation. The redesigned Acura MDX's unit-body was engineered with Honda's Advanced Compatibility Engineering (ACE) body structure designed to absorb energy from a collision. The suspension was tuned at Germany's Nürburgring race track. It is one of the most powerful engines Honda has produced to date. The "VTM-4" all-wheel drive system on the previous generation was replaced by the new SH-AWD "Super Handling All-Wheel Drive" previously debuted on the 2005 Acura RL. This AWD system is one of the most advanced in its class, featuring an active rear differential often found on high performance cars. The MDX is able to tow .

Like many Acura models, the MDX comes with a power sunroof, leather interior, and high-intensity discharge (Xenon) low-beam headlights. For the 2007 through 2009 model years, three option packages were available: Sport, Technology and Entertainment.
 The Technology Package includes the Acura/Alpine DVD-based satellite GPS navigation system with AcuraLink satellite communications with real-time traffic reporting (XM NavTraffic), a 410-watt Acura/ELS DTS Surround audio system with XM Satellite Radio, backup camera, and a remote powered liftgate, operated either from the key's remote, inside the car or directly from the lift gate.
 The Sport Package featured active suspension dampers (co-developed by Honda and Beijing West Industries) that dynamically improves handling according to road conditions with a button in the center stack to switch to Sport/Comfort modes. This Comfort/Sport mode uses magneto rheological dampers, which change their characteristics when a magnetic field is introduced (usually in milliseconds). The Sport package also includes unique 5-spoke aluminum-alloy wheels, perforated leather seats and the items in the Technology package.
 The Entertainment Package offers a flip-down  LCD screen with 2 wireless Dolby Digital headphones, second-row heated outboard seats, and a unique center-stack silver trim. The Entertainment Package is only available on Sport or Technology Package models as compared to the 1st Generation MDX where the Entertainment Package was available as a standalone package on Touring Models.

All Canadian Acura MDX models, aside from the heated front seats, also get the second-row heated outboard seats as standard equipment as well. A feature unique to Canadian MDX models are headlight washers. In terms of packages, Canadian MDX models get only two: Technology and Elite. The Technology package corresponds essentially to the US model's Technology package while the Elite package is an amalgamation of the US model's Sport and Entertainment packages. However, AcuraLink real-time traffic reporting through XM NavTraffic is unavailable for Canadian MDX models.

Like the first generation model, the new generation is manufactured exclusively by Honda of Canada Manufacturing Ltd. in Alliston, Ontario, Canada. But along with the 2007 RDX, the new MDX was the first Acura model to pass the Acura Quality Line, a special quality control and verification process separate from the other Honda vehicles.

For 2008 the MDX received a new auto-dimming rearview mirror. The 2009 MDX had added more upgrades to the navigation system and there are two new colors added. The power tailgate, previously available only with the Entertainment package, is now included with Technology and Sport packages.

In 2010, the MDX received a facelift adopting to Acura's new "Power Plenum" grille that debuted on its 2009 model year sedans. The most important upgrades to the 2010 model where a new paddle shift six-speed SportShift automatic transmission with downshift Rev-matching, and an increase in compression ratio to 11.2:1 with forged aluminum pistons to replace the previous 2007–2009 3.7L's 11.0:1 pistons. Structural rigidity was improved for the 2010 model year. An Advance Package became available that included Adaptive Cruise Control, blind spot monitor, Active Damper suspension, collision mitigation braking system, wider 7-spoked 19 inch wheels and tires, Premium Milano leather ventilated seats and auto leveling headlights. Non-navigation equipped MDX models now have a backup camera monitor located in the rear-view mirror.

The redesigned MDX overtook the TL as Acura's top seller in the United States.

Third generation (YD3/4; 2014) 

The 2014 MDX Prototype was unveiled at the 2013 North American International Auto Show, the production version was revealed at the New York Auto Show. Production began on May 2, 2013; vehicle assembly shifted from Ontario, Canada to Lincoln, Alabama. US sales began on June 20.

The MDX is powered by a 3.5-liter direct injected Earth Dreams V6 with Variable Cylinder Management. A front-wheel drive (FWD) model is available for the first time, in Canada all-wheel drive remains the only configuration offered. EPA-estimated fuel economy is improved with all-wheel drive (SH-AWD) models rated at // (city/highway/combined) and FWD models rated at // (city/highway/combined).

The headlights are Acura's Jewel Eye LED Headlights (first introduced on the RLX).  Each headlamp uses five separate LED sources with three used for low-beam lighting and two for high-beam lighting. LED bumper mounted fog lamps are offered as a dealer installed option.

The interior reduced button clutter by adding a 7-inch touchscreen with haptic feedback, an additional 8-inch screen is also standard. To reduce interior noise an acoustic (PVB layered) windshield, acoustic front door glass and thicker rear glass are used as well as triple sealed door openings. Advance package models include further noise reduction using a thicker carpet base layer and front fender liners. The seating H-point has been reduced.

According to Acura the exterior is more aerodynamic reducing drag by 16% with the new model lapping Nürburgring 8 seconds faster than its predecessor. The steering gear ratio is 9% quicker for a more sporty feel. The MDX rides lower reducing its center of gravity, to reduce unsprung mass the front suspension lower control arms are made from forged aluminum. Structure rigidity is improved and weight reduced through increased use of high-strength steel. Overall, 64% of the total vehicle body mass is high strength steel (HSS), aluminum and magnesium. HSS makes up 59% of vehicle body mass; 1,500 MPa yield strength steel makes up 7%. A single ring-like hot stamped HSS outer door ring component reinforces the A-pillar, roof rail, B-pillar, and lower floor rail encircling the front doors for improved crash protection. Acura states that after conducting a simulated IIHS 25% small offset frontal crash test the front doors will open with normal force.

The updated Adaptive Cruise Control adds low-speed stop-and-go functionality. In terms of safety the MDX adds a standard driver's knee airbag, optional Lane Keeping Assist System and Collision Mitigation Braking System.

1 vehicle structure rated "Good"
2 strength-to-weight ratio: 5.87

MY 2016
Acura swapped the Honda 6-speed automatic transmission for a ZF 9-speed automatic and changed the SH-AWD system for 2016. The revised SH-AWD system uses a hydraulically-controlled clutch and is similar to system found in the TLX.

MY 2017 facelift (YD4)

A refreshed for 2017 model year MDX went on sale in June 2016, and features a diamond pentagon front grille which debuted on the Acura Precision Concept, redesigned LED headlamps with automatic high beams, LED DRL light pipes and LED amber light pipe turn signals. Restyled LED fog lamps are optional from the factory. MDX models will come standard with AcuraWatch which includes forward collision warning (with automatic emergency braking), lane departure warning (with lane keep assist) and Adaptive Cruise Control. A 360-degree surround view camera is optional. To reduce body mass the front fenders switched from steel to an aluminum panel.

Hybrid
A 3.0-liter V6, 7-speed dual-clutch, 1.3 kWh lithium-ion battery hybrid called the MDX Sport Hybrid was added to the lineup. The front wheels are powered by the engine and a single electric motor while the rear wheels are powered by twin electric motors (tri-motor). The hybrid was only available in all-wheel drive. Acura's Active Damper System is standard. Sales began in April 2017.

MY 2019
For 2019, the Active Damper System is available for non-hybrids, the front seats feature 4-way power lumbar. During the 2018 New York International Auto Show, alongside the debut of the third generation RDX, Acura announced the introduction of the A-Spec appearance package. The exterior features black and dark chrome accents, replacing all the chrome and rides on 20" grey aluminum wheels. The bumpers are redesigned to give the A-Spec a more sharp and aggressive design. Red leather seats with black alcantara inserts is now an option for the A-Spec package. Other changes for the A-Spec trim are new gauges, carbon fiber trim, sport pedals, and thicker steering wheel with paddle shifters.

Powertrain

Marketing
As part of 2014 Acura MDX launch in the United States, a campaign called 'The Extremely New MDX - Made for Mankind' was produced. The campaign highlights the complete technical transformation of the MDX and centers around the idea of "Made for Mankind," a concept designed to highlight the unique engineering and design philosophy at the heart of all Acura vehicles - the synergy between man and machine. The campaign was developed by Mullen (Boston and LA) and with MediaVest. Also, a series of 8 comedic commercials were created with comedian Jerry Seinfeld and director Barry Sonnenfeld. In addition, Acura became an exclusive sponsor of Comedians in Cars Getting Coffee.

Fourth generation (YD8/9/YE1; 2022)

Skipping the 2021 model year, the fourth-generation MDX was revealed as a prototype on October 14, 2020, virtually revealed on December 8, went into bulk production on January 12, 2021 for the 2022 model year, and went on sale on February 2, with the Type-S trim released on December 23. Acura claims the MDX is their flagship model following the discontinuation of the RLX in June 2020.

The exterior includes the standard panoramic sunroof, either 19 or 20-inch alloy rims, a tailgate similar to the 2019 RDX, headlights and taillights similar to the current TLX, a differently styled grille emblem, nine exterior and seven interior colors. For the Type-S trim, a yellow color, called Tiger Eye will also be available. The improved interior includes a 12.3-inch infotainment system and the Acura's first 12-inch digital full TFT instrument cluster, touch pad, 16-way power front seats with 3-memory positions, removable center second row seat, a removal double sided trunk floor with carpet and plastic, and more legroom and headroom compared to the third generation MDX. The MDX also features an optional audio system with 16-speakers including four roof-mounted speakers and a foot sensor for Hands Free Access power tailgate release and closure when the key fob is nearby. A redesigned key fob that is shaped like a convex irregular polygon is included.

Powertrains are improved, with the existing 3.5-liter V6 paired with a 10-speed transmission available for four trims; base, technology package, A-Spec, and advance package. While the all-wheel-drive (AWD) is optional on the base and technology trims, it is standard on A-Spec and advance trims. The Type-S trim model will get a 3.0-liter turbocharged V6 and front brakes with four-piston Brembo calipers as standard. All-wheel-drive will also be standard for the Type-S.

In the front, a double wishbone suspension with forged aluminum lower control arms, damper forks, and steering knuckles makes its way into the MDX along with more rigid cast-aluminum shock towers, larger front brake rotors and wider alloy wheels. Plastic wheel well liners are replaced with fabric material and a repositioned air intake for easier access to both battery terminals. High-strength steel (HSS), press-hardened steel and aluminum make up 69.7% of vehicle body mass. The rear body is more rigid with suspension load paths passing into the C and D-pillars, allowing for towing capabilities. Standard towing capacity is  while it can be increased to  when the transmission cooler is added. The cooler kit is available as an accessory for the AWD models.

Awards 
 North American Car of the Year Utility Finalist for 2019.
 Car and Driver magazine's Best Luxury SUV in 2001.
 Motor Trend magazine's SUV of the Year Contender in 2017.
 The MDX also won the IIHS Top Safety Pick award for the 2018 model year.
 The 2019 Acura MDX ranked #6 Luxury Midsize SUV by U.S. News & World Report as of 2019.
The MDX was ranked 7th for the SUV vehicle owners keep for the longest time according to a 2019 iSeeCars study.

Sales figures

References

External links

 Official website

MDX
Cars introduced in 2000
2010s cars
2020s cars
Mid-size sport utility vehicles
Luxury crossover sport utility vehicles
Front-wheel-drive vehicles
All-wheel-drive vehicles
Motor vehicles manufactured in the United States
Flagship vehicles